"Meaning" is the first episode of the third season of House and the 47th episode overall. It aired on Fox on September 5, 2006.

Plot
House, still benefiting from his ketamine-induced coma, is seen running and pain-free, has recovered from multiple gunshot wounds, and is back at work after two months, taking on two cases simultaneously. The first is Richard, who has been paralyzed and unable to speak since brain cancer surgery eight years earlier, and who drives his wheelchair into a pool. The second is Caren, a young woman mysteriously paralyzed from the neck down after a yoga session, despite no evidence of injury to her neck or spine. Cuddy and Wilson are convinced House is creating a mystery out of Richard's case to cure his own boredom.

House concludes Caren is faking the paralysis, and tries to prove it by burning her foot, causing her to move her leg in reflex. When she develops shortness of breath, House again accuses her of faking and threatens to stick a huge needle into her back. He notices engorged neck veins and plunges the needle into her chest to learn that blood is building up around her heart. House insists on opening her up to find the tumor that he thinks is there. Before surgery, he notices a discolored toenail and diagnoses her with scurvy.

House orders an upper endoscopic ultrasound for Richard, but Foreman objects that his throat will collapse; it does, and Richard almost dies. House orders an MRI scan of the brain with heavy doses of contrast, and Foreman tells him that it will cause a bleed into Richard's brain. Foreman's predictions hold true and Richard almost dies again.

While running at night, House hypothesizes that a corticosteroid production imbalance in Richard's adrenal gland is the cause of the paralysis, which points to Addison's disease, and that a cortisol injection might cure him.

Although forbidding House to treat Richard, Cuddy gives Richard the cortisol injection when he is being discharged from the hospital. Seconds later, Richard rises from his wheelchair and hugs his family. Wilson argues against telling House, that being right is not the same as having the right to do everything with the patient on House's guess. Cuddy argues she will be seeing House every day, Wilson closes with, "Everybody lies". House forges a prescription with Wilson's pad, signaling the pain in his leg is returning.

External links

 

House (season 3) episodes
2006 American television episodes
Television episodes about suicide